Portora Royal School located in Enniskillen, County Fermanagh, Northern Ireland, was one of the public schools founded by the royal charter in 1608, by James I, making it one of the oldest schools in Ireland at the time of its closure. Originally called Enniskillen Royal School, the school was established some ten years after the Royal Decree, in 1618, 15 miles outside Enniskillen at Ballybalfour under the direction of Sir William Cole, before moving to Enniskillen in 1661. It was not until 1778 that the school moved to its final location on Portora Hill, Enniskillen, where the nucleus of the later all boys school was built. The school admitted a mixture of boarders and day pupils for much of its history, but became a day school in the 1990s.

On 28 June 2016, Portora Royal School closed. Portora Royal School amalgamated with Enniskillen Collegiate Grammar School which launched the mixed Enniskillen Royal Grammar School on 1 September 2016, which is partially based on the original site of Portora Hill and the site of Enniskillen Collegiate Grammar School.

Notable headmasters
1935–1945: I. M. B. Stuart, Ireland rugby footballer.

Old Portorans

Desmond Arthur, early 20th century pilot
Samuel Beckett, winner of Nobel Prize in Literature and the only winner of the Nobel Prize to have played first-class cricket.
James David Bourchier, journalist and Bulgarian confidant
Denis Parsons Burkitt, surgeon.
Sir Andrew Clarke, Governor of the Straits Settlements
Edward Cooney, Cooneyite founder
Nigel Dodds, politician – MLA and Member of Parliament, Deputy Leader of the Democratic Unionist Party 
Charles Duff, writer and polyglot
Gordon Dunne, MLA
Cyril Falls, World War 1 military historian.
Ken Fleming, civil engineer and foundations specialist 
James Gamble, founder of Procter & Gamble.
Neil Hannon, singer and songwriter
William Hearn, legal academic.
George Hegarty, World War 1 flying ace.
Michael Jackson, Church of Ireland Lord Archbishop of Dublin (and formerly Lord Bishop of Clogher) 
Sir Jim Kilfedder, former Unionist MP 
Dickie Lloyd, cricketer and rugby union player.
Henry Francis Lyte, Anglican minister and Hymn writer 
Billy McComb, world famed entertainer and magician 
Leo McKinstry, journalist and author
Donald Burgess McNeill, physics academic, transport author, keen rower, and first Esquire Bedale of Southampton University
Sir Roy McNulty, businessman. 
Vivian Mercier, literary critic
E. Charles Nelson, botanist.
Sir Edward Sullivan, 1st Baronet, Lord Chancellor of Ireland.
John Sullivan - Jesuit priest.
Sir Charles Tegart, Commissioner of the Indian Police and Palestine fort builder.
 Emily Valentine - 1st known woman to play rugby
 Brian Goold-Verschoyle - British Communist, Spanish Civil War veteran, died a victim of Stalin's Great Purge in a Soviet gulag.
Leslie Waddington, art dealer
Peter Webb, cricketer and business executive
Harry West, politician (Ulster Unionist Party leader and Stormont Minister) 
Oscar Wilde, playwright
H.M. French, artist and latinist

Oscar Wilde
Former pupil Oscar Wilde won a scholarship to Trinity College Dublin, and his name appears on the school's Honours board. There is also an Ulster History Circle Blue Plaque on the school building commemorating him.

Wilde's name was painted over in 1895 following his imprisonment for homosexuality, which was criminalised in the United Kingdom. Additionally, initials he had carved into the window casement of a classroom as a student there were removed. His name was later reinstated on the Honours board.

Formation of Enniskillen Royal Grammar School
A proposal by the Department of Education to merge Portora Royal School with the Enniskillen Collegiate Grammar School to form "Enniskillen Royal Grammar School" was approved by the Minister of Education, John O'Dowd, in June 2015 but the matter was taken to the High Court in October 2015 due to much local opposition. The High Court bid to stop the amalgamation of the two Enniskillen grammar schools failed.

See also
Portora Castle

References

External links
Portora Royal School official web page
BBC article

1608 establishments in Ireland
Educational institutions established in the 1600s
Organisations based in Northern Ireland with royal patronage
Member schools of the Headmasters' and Headmistresses' Conference
Enniskillen
Grade B1 listed buildings
Schools with a royal charter